The New London Whalers were a minor league baseball team that played in New London, Connecticut from 1898 to 1910.

External links
Baseball Reference

Defunct Connecticut State League teams
Defunct Connecticut League teams
Defunct Connecticut Association teams
Professional baseball teams in Connecticut
Defunct baseball teams in Connecticut
Baseball teams established in 1898
Baseball teams disestablished in 1910
Connecticut League teams